Love Child is an Australian television drama. It was created by Sarah Lambert, the co-creator of House Husbands. It premiered on the Nine Network on 17 February 2014. The show focuses on Dr Joan Millar (Jessica Marais), a doctor who works alongside Dr Patrick McNaughton (Jonathan LaPaglia) and Matron Frances Bolton (Mandy McElhinney) at the fictional Kings Cross Hospital's Stanton House for pregnant girls who are unmarried.

Series overview

Episodes

Series 1 (2014)

Series 2 (2015)

Series 3 (2016)

Series 4 (2017)

Ratings

References 

Lists of Australian drama television series episodes